Un Piano is a solo album by American jazz pianist Matthew Shipp which was recorded in 2007 and released on the French RogueArt label.

Reception
The All About Jazz review by Lyn Horton states "Shipp reaches sonorities similar to the ones he has discovered before, but has found them starting from a different standpoint, a wider yet more honed transfiguration of the 88-key spectrum within which he breathes."

Track listing
All compositions by Matthew Shipp
 "Enter In" – 3:05
 "Geometry" – 4:11
 "Sparks" – 2:40
 "Spike" – 3:31
 "Linear Shocks" – 5:42
 "Two Things Together" – 4:46
 "Whole Zone" – 1:58
 "Simple Fact" – 3:18
 "Riddle" – 6:10
 "Cloud Chamber 6" – 6:10
 "Harmony of Apollo" – 4:56
 "Exit Out" – 3:26

Personnel
Matthew Shipp – piano

References

2008 albums
Matthew Shipp albums
Solo piano jazz albums
RogueArt albums